The 2008 Emerald Bowl, part of the 2008–09 NCAA football bowl games season, was played on December 27, 2008, at AT&T Park, the home field of the Giants in San Francisco, California. The Miami Hurricanes of the ACC were matched against the California Golden Bears (based in nearby Berkeley, California) of the Pac-10, the first appearance by either team in the seven-year history of the Emerald Bowl.

With a 24–17 victory over Miami, Cal improved its record to 10–8–1 all-time in bowl games, and 2–2 all-time vs. Miami.  Miami fell to 18–14 all-time in bowl games.  California and Miami had met three times previously, with Miami holding a 2–1 advantage.  The first meeting resulted in a 9–7 win by Cal in Miami on October 10, 1964.  Miami won the next two meetings, 31–3 on September 16, 1989, in Miami, and 52–24 on September 15, 1990, in Berkeley.

Records
A number of Emerald Bowl records were set in this game:
 Attendance: 42,268
 Longest Pass Play: 74 yards; Nate Longshore to Verran Tucker (California)
 Most Yards Rushing: 186 yards, Jahvid Best (California)
 Longest Rush: 42 yards, Jahvid Best (California)
 Quarterback Sacks By: 2, Zack Follett (California)
 Most Total Plays: 124, Miami (73) vs. California (51)

Scoring summary

References

External links

 Game summary at ESPN
 Box score via newspapers.com

Emerald Bowl
Redbox Bowl
California Golden Bears football bowl games
Miami Hurricanes football bowl games
Emerald Bowl
December 2008 sports events in the United States
2008 in San Francisco